The 2002 Men's European Handball Championship was the fifth edition of the tournament and took place from 25 January to 3 February 2002 in Sweden.

Qualification 

Note: Bold indicates champion for that year. Italic indicates host for that year.

Venues

Preliminary round 
All times are local (UTC+1).

Group A

Group B

Group C

Group D

Main round 
Points gained in the preliminary round against teams that also qualified, were carried over.

Group I

Group II

Placement games

Eleventh place game

Ninth place game

Seventh place game

Fifth place game

Final round

Bracket

Semifinals

Third place game

Final

Ranking and statistics

Final ranking

All-Star Team 

Source: EHF

Top goalscorers 

Source: EHF

Top goalkeepers 
(minimum 20% of total shots received by team)

Source: EHF EHF

References

External links 
 Results

E
H
European Men's Handball Championship
Handball
January 2002 sports events in Europe
February 2002 sports events in Europe
International sports competitions in Stockholm
International sports competitions in Gothenburg
2000s in Stockholm
2000s in Gothenburg
Sports competitions in Helsingborg
Sports competitions in Skövde
Sports competitions in Jönköping
Sports competitions in Västerås